Mosnac-Saint-Simeux is a commune in the Charente department in southwestern France. It was established on 1 January 2021 from the amalgamation of the communes of Mosnac and Saint-Simeux.

Politics and administration 
The municipal council at its creation was composed of all municipal councillors from both regrouped communes.

Delegated communes

See also
Communes of the Charente department
List of new French communes created in 2021

References

Communes of Charente
Communes nouvelles of Charente
Populated places established in 2021
2021 establishments in France